Plocaederus plicatus is a species of longhorn beetle of the subfamily of Cerambycinae. Distributed in Bolivia — in the department of Santa Cruz, in Brazil, Venezuela, Suriname, and French Guinea.

References

Plocaederus
Beetles described in 1790